{{DISPLAYTITLE:C19H18O6}}
The molecular formula C19H18O6 (molar mass: 342.34 g/mol, exact mass: 342.1103 u) may refer to:

 Zapotin, a flavone
 Decarboxylated 8,5'-diferulic acid, a diferulic acid